The 1984 Detroit Lions season was their 55th in the National Football League. The team failed to improve upon their previous season's output of 9–7, winning only four games. The team missed the playoffs for the first time in three seasons. Like the previous season, the Lions started 1–4, but unlike 1983, the Lions couldn't come back. In a season littered with numerous key injuries, the most painful was star running back Billy Sims suffering a career-ending knee injury in a game against the Minnesota Vikings. In just five seasons in the NFL since joining Detroit in 1980, Sims had set the Lions career rushing mark at 5,106.

Offseason

NFL Draft

Roster

Schedule

Game summaries

Week 1 (Sunday, September 2, 1984): vs. San Francisco 49ers 

Point spread: 49ers by 2½
 Over/Under: 43.0 (over)
 Time of Game:

Week 2: at Atlanta Falcons

Week 14: at Seattle Seahawks

Standings

References

Detroit Lions seasons
Detroit Lions
Detroit Lions